Acrocercops scenias is a moth of the family Gracillariidae. It is known from India (Karnataka).

The larvae feed on Changana bush.

References

scenias
Moths described in 1914
Moths of Asia